The Detroit Publishing Company was an American photographic publishing firm best known for its large assortment of photochrom color postcards.

History

The Detroit Publishing Company was started by publisher William A. Livingstone and photographer Edwin H. Husher in the late 19th century as the Detroit Photographic Company, it later became The Detroit Photochrom Company, and it was not until 1905 that the company called itself the Detroit Publishing Company.

The company acquired rights to a color printing process developed by Hans Jakob Schmid of Orell Fussli & Company of Switzerland called Photochrom. Photochrom allowed for the company to mass market postcards and other materials in color. The Detroit Detroit Publishing Company started to market this in 1907 under the name "photostint."

By the time of World War I, the company faced declining sales both due to the war economy and the competition from cheaper, more advanced printing methods. The company declared bankruptcy in 1924 and was liquidated in 1932.

William Henry Jackson
The best-known photographer for the company was William Henry Jackson, who joined the company in 1897. He became the plant manager in 1903, and in 1905 the company changed its name.

References

Further reading
"Chapter II: William Henry Jackson and the Detroit Publishing Company", in Jack Davis and Dorothy Ryan: Samuel L. Schmucker: The Discovery of His Lost Art, pp. 25–48, Olde America Antiques (2001).  (Google books)
In Living Color: The Forgotten 19th-Century Photo Technology that Romanticized America - Collectors Weekly article
Dating Guide for Detroit Company Postcards, Newberry Library

Library Collections
Most of the existing negatives and prints are now housed by the United States Library of Congress, which received them via the Edison Institute and the Colorado Historical Society in 1949. Most images are visible in digital form at the Library of Congress Web site.
 Detroit Photographic Company’s Views of North America, ca. 1897-1924 from the Beinecke Rare Book & Manuscript Library
Detroit Publishing Company Collection - Library of Congress
The Detroit Publishing Company Collection at the New-York Historical Society
The Detroit Publishing Company Collection at the Newberry Library
William Henry Jackson Photochrom Collection, Decker Library, Maryland Institute College of Art
William Henry Jackson Photochrom Print Collection, Newberry Library
William Henry Jackson Photochrom Collection, Amherst College Archives and Special Collections

Postcard publishers
Printing companies of the United States
Defunct manufacturing companies based in Michigan